Professor Giuli Gegelia (born 20 July 1942) is a Georgian architect, Professor of Architecture at the Georgian Technical University, since 1998, and member of the Executive Board of the Union of Georgian Architects. In 2008, Professor Gegelia was awarded the prestigious Honorary Architect of Georgia title.
Gegelia has served as an independent architectural expert, as part of various selective commissions and juries, providing architectural advice to the Ministry of Culture and Sport and the Ministry of Education of Georgia on a wide range of issues such as restoration of historic heritage sites or standard of educational institutions.

Giuli Gegelia was one of the architects employed, by the Government of Georgia and the Foundation for the Preservation of Cultural Heritage Sites of Georgia, to design the rehabilitation and restoration of historic zones of Sighnaghi, Mtskheta and Batumi, as part of the wider initiative of the Georgian Government to implement massive restoration works of historic zones. Professor Gegelia has authored 9 papers regarding the restoration and reconstruction of Old Tbilisi and has published 16 articles in Georgian, Polish and Russian magazines.

Early life and career
Giuli Gegelia was born in Senaki, western Georgia to the family of Grigol Gegelia, a combat medic during the Second World War and later the Chief Doctor of Menji Sanatorium, and Margarita Khocholava, ophthalmologist. Having completed secondary education with a Golden Medal, Gegelia read architecture at the Georgian Technical University, graduating in 1965. In the period between 1968 and 1998, he held various positions in the Faculty of Architecture, including Senior Teacher, and received professorship in 1998.

Selected publications
 My ne moźem dat' vse ego proizvedenija, nuźen vybor
 Proekty, upomjanutye v konce Vaśego teksta ne realizovany, da? Znaćit, ich ne nado      dat'
 Stil' novych rabot?
 Architektur der DDR GOD? (12) 745-752

See also

Architecture of Georgia (country)
Grigol Gegelia
Gandzieli-Gegelia

References

Architects from Georgia (country)
1942 births
Living people
People from Samegrelo-Zemo Svaneti